Sviatoslav III Vsevolodovich of Vladimir (Russian: Святослав III Всеволодович) (27 March 1196 – 3 February 1252) was the Prince of Novgorod (1200–1205, 1207–1210) and Grand Prince of Vladimir-Suzdal (1246–1248).

Sviatoslav III Vsevolodovich was the sixth son of Vsevolod the Big Nest and Maria Shvarnovna. During the partition of his father's lands, he received the town of Yuriev-Polsky. It was he who commissioned the town's principal landmark, the Cathedral of St. George, constructed in 1230–34. In 1220 Sviatoslav sacked Aşlı in Volga Bulgaria.

Sviatoslav III's reign in Vladimir was short and uneventful. In 1248, his nephew Mikhail Khorobrit of Moscow, in defiance of the centuries-old succession system, seized the city of Vladimir and ousted Sviatoslav back to Yuriev-Polsky. Two years later, Sviatoslav and his son visited the Golden Horde, pleading with the Khan to reinstate him on the grand princely throne. He died on 3 February 1252 and was buried in Yuriev-Polsky.

Further reading
 Bibliography of the history of the Early Slavs and Rus'
 Bibliography of Russian history (1223–1613)
 List of Slavic studies journals

1196 births
1252 deaths
Grand Princes of Vladimir
Rurik dynasty
13th-century princes in Kievan Rus'
Eastern Orthodox monarchs